Faisal Hasan Ali Hasan Abudahoom (born 25 September 1988) is a Bahraini professional footballer who plays as a forward for Riffa.

Career statistics

International
Scores and results list Bahrain's goal tally first.

Honours 
Riffa
 Bahraini Premier League: 2013–14
 Bahraini FA Cup: 2013–14
 Bahraini King's Cup runner-up: 2013

References

External links 
 

1988 births
Living people
Bahraini footballers
Bahrain international footballers
Association football forwards
2015 AFC Asian Cup players